Pleasant Township is one of the thirteen townships of Fairfield County, Ohio, United States. As of the 2010 census the population was 6,083, of whom 5,512 lived in the unincorporated portions of the township.

Geography
Located in the central part of the county, it borders the following townships:
Walnut Township - north
Richland Township - northeast
Rush Creek Township - southeast
Berne Township - south
Hocking Township - southwest corner
Greenfield Township - west
Liberty Township - northwest

Parts of two municipalities are located in Pleasant Township: the city of Lancaster, the county seat of Fairfield County, in the southwest; and the village of Pleasantville in the north.

Name and history
Pleasant Township was so named on account of their fertile soil. It is one of fifteen Pleasant Townships statewide.

Government
The township is governed by a three-member board of trustees, who are elected in November of odd-numbered years to a four-year term beginning on the following January 1. Two are elected in the year after the presidential election and one is elected in the year before it. There is also an elected township fiscal officer, who serves a four-year term beginning on April 1 of the year after the election, which is held in November of the year before the presidential election. Vacancies in the fiscal officership or on the board of trustees are filled by the remaining trustees.

References

External links
Pleasant Township official website
County website

Townships in Fairfield County, Ohio
Townships in Ohio